Roberto Méndez (born 6 March 1947) is a former professional baseball infielder. He played in the Mexican League, the highest level of professional baseball in Mexico, from 1965 to 1984. He also spent part of 1966 in the Mexican Southeast League. He also managed the Ángeles de Puebla for part of the 1987 season, replacing Rodolfo Sandoval. He was elected to the Mexican Professional Baseball Hall of Fame in 2000.

References

External links

1945 births
Living people
Rojos del Águila de Veracruz players
Alacranes de Campeche players
Alacranes de Durango players
Cerveceros de Orizaba players
Charros de Jalisco players
Mexican Baseball Hall of Fame inductees
Mexican baseball players
Mineros de Fresnillo players
Minor league baseball managers
Tigres del México players